is the third studio album by Japanese hip hop producer DJ Krush. It was released on July 21, 1995 in Japan by Sony Music Entertainment.

Meiso was issued in the United Kingdom on October 30, 1995 by the label Mo' Wax, peaking at number 64 on the UK Albums Chart. It was released in the United States on April 9, 1996 by Mo' Wax and FFRR Records. The album produced the singles "Meiso" and "Only the Strong Survive", which reached numbers 52 and 71 respectively on the UK Singles Chart.

Composition
Fact described Meiso as an album of sample-based trip hop music. AllMusic critic Ned Raggett said that the music continued in the vein of DJ Krush's past work, incorporating "mid- to slow-tempo grooves and breaks" and exploring "everything from jazz and funk to experimental ambient production." The album features guest performances from several American rappers: CL Smooth on "Only the Strong Survive", Roots members Black Thought and Malik B. on "Meiso", Deflon Sallahr on "Ground", and Guru and Big Shug on "Most Wanted Man". "Make no mistake", Muziks Will Ashon wrote of Meiso, "this is a hip hop album".

Critical reception

Dan Glaister of The Guardian found Meiso more accessible than DJ Krush's previous releases, attributing this partly to the more prominent rapping on the album. Glaister praised the record as an effective "blend of the upbeat with contemplative and downright mysterious instrumentals". Writing for Trouser Press, Mark Kemp said that it pointed toward "further fascinating intercultural exploration of the space between foursquare hip-hop and floating ambient techno." In 2015, Fact ranked Meiso at number 12 on its list of the best trip hop albums of all time.

Track listing

Personnel
Credits are adapted from the album's liner notes.

Musicians
 DJ Krush – beats, scratching, drum programming on "Duality", abstract programming on "Bypath – Would You Take It?"
 Big Shug – vocals on "Most Wanted Man"
 Black Thought – vocals on "Meiso"
 DJ Hide – scratching on "Anticipation"
 DJ Shadow – beats, scratching, and drum programming on "Duality"
 Guru – vocals on "Most Wanted Man"
 Malik B. – vocals on "Meiso"
 Deflon Sallahr – vocals on "Ground"
 CL Smooth – vocals on "Only the Strong Survive"

Production
 DJ Krush – production, mixing
 Noriko Asano – executive production
 Toshiya Horiuchi – mastering
 Ken Duro Ifill – recording
 Tetsuo Kato – executive production
 Koichi "Oppenheimer" Matsuki – recording
 Yoko Yamanaka – recording (assistant)

Design
 Mami Ikeda – translation
 Sachiko Kishi – translation
 Masato Nakamura – photography
 Sakaguchi Ken Factory – art direction, design

Charts

References

External links
 

1995 albums
DJ Krush albums
Sony Music Entertainment Japan albums
FFRR Records albums
Mo' Wax albums